Berkeley Bertram McGarrell Gaskin (21 March 1908 - 2 May 1979) was a West Indian cricketer and administrator who played in two Tests in 1947-48.

Gaskin played first-class cricket as a medium-pace bowler and lower-order batsman for British Guiana from 1929 to 1953, captaining the side from 1950–51 to 1952–53. His best bowling figures were 7 for 58 against Jamaica in 1950–51.

He managed the West Indies side on three overseas tours: to India and Pakistan in 1958–59, to England in 1963, and to Australia and New Zealand in 1968–69. He was President of the Guyana Cricket Association at the time of his death, and had also served as a West Indies selector.

He worked as a senior official in the Guyanese civil service.

References

External links
 
 Berkeley Gaskin at CricketArchive

1908 births
1979 deaths
West Indies Test cricketers
Guyanese cricketers
Guyana cricketers
Sportspeople from Georgetown, Guyana
Guyanese cricket administrators